Yonge is a surname. Notable people with the surname include:

 Charles Duke Yonge (1812–1891), English historian and translator of Philo of Alexandria
 Charles Maurice Yonge (1899–1986), British marine biologist 
 Charlotte Mary Yonge (1823–1901), English author
 Sir George Yonge, 5th Baronet (1731–1812), British Secretary at War and the namesake of Yonge Street
 Jane Yonge, New Zealand theatre director 
 John Yonge (1465–1516), English bishop and diplomat
 Sir John Yonge, 1st Baronet (1603–1663), English merchant and Member of Parliament
 Nicholas Yonge (1560–1619), English Renaissance singer and publisher
 Roby Yonge (1943–1997), American radio DJ
  Thomas Yonge or Young (1405–1476), MP for Bristol and Gloustershire, justice of the Common Pleas and the King's Bench
 Walter Yonge of Colyton (1579–1649), English lawyer, merchant and Member of Parliament
 Sir Walter Yonge, 2nd Baronet (1625–1670)
 Sir Walter Yonge, 3rd Baronet (1653–1731)
 William Yonge (disambiguation)

See also
 Yonge Street, a street in Toronto, Ontario, Canada
 York Regional Road 1, part of Yonge Street in York Region, Ontario
 York Regional Road 51, part of Yonge Street in Holland Landing, Ontario
 Simcoe County Road 4, part of Yonge Street in Simcoe County, Ontario
 Highway 11 (Ontario)

English-language surnames